Caputo is a common Italian surname. It derives from the Latin root of caput, meaning "source" or "head."  People with that name include:

 Anthony "Acid" Caputo, American DJ, producer and remixer
 Bruce Faulkner Caputo, American politician
 Chuck Caputo, American politician
 Chuck Caputo, American magician
 Dante Caputo, Argentine academic, politician and diplomat
 David A. Caputo, American academic
 Francesco Caputo, Italian footballer
 John D. Caputo, American philosopher
 John S. Caputo, American/Italian communication scholar
 Joseph Claude Caputo, American jazz musician, known as Joe Cabot
 Lisa Caputo, American businesswoman
 Michael A. Caputo, American professional football player
 Michael R. Caputo, Republican political strategist and media consultant
 Michael "Mike" Caputo, American politician
 Mina Caputo, formerly known as Keith Caputo, American singer
 Philip Caputo, American writer
 Sergio Caputo, Italian musician
 Theresa Caputo, American television personality
 Tony C. Caputo, American publisher
 Lisa Nowak (née Caputo), American Naval Aviator and former astronaut

Fictional characters
 Joe Caputo, the fictional Litchfield Director of Human Activities on Orange is the New Black

Italian-language surnames